Franklin House of San Diego, California was a historic hotel.  It was built by Selim Franklin and his brother at 203-205 Sansome in 1852.  The Annals of San Francisco (1855) lists the Franklin House as one of five more upscale hotels in the city. Permanent residents included physicians, attorneys and a judge. Cousins Lewis and Maurice Franklin relocated to San Diego and built the Franklin House there in 1855, the first three-story building in Southern California.

See also 
 Mary Chase Walker (Walker Incident)

References

Hotels in California